Pinjar may refer to:

 Pinjar, Western Australia, suburb of Perth, Western Australia
 Pinjar (novel), 1950 Punjabi novel by Amrita Pritam
 Pinjar (film), 2003 Bollywood film